Jonah Lomu was an international rugby union winger who played for New Zealand between 1994 and 2002. He scored a total of 37 tries in 63 international appearances, which makes him the sixth highest try scorer for New Zealand and the eighteenth highest on the all-time list. Lomu held alone the record for the most tries scored in the Rugby World Cup (15 in 11 matches at the 1995 and 1999 tournaments), until South Africa's Bryan Habana equalled his tally at the 2015 tournament.

Lomu made his debut for New Zealand in June 1994 against France. He scored his first international try in his third appearance, scoring twice against Ireland in New Zealand's opening game of the 1995 Rugby World Cup. This was followed with a try against Scotland in the quarter-finals and four tries against England in the semi-finals—the most Lomu would score in a single match. He was, however, unable to score a try in the final, as South Africa beat New Zealand to win the trophy. Lomu played 13 times against South Africa during his career, but failed to score a try against them. The only other "Tier 1" national team against which Lomu did not score a try was Wales. Lomu finished 1995 with 12 international tries, his highest tally in a single year.

After two tries in 1996, including one in the inaugural Tri Nations Series, Lomu was unable to score in three appearances during 1997. At the 1999 Rugby World Cup, he scored in each of New Zealand's group stage matches against Tonga, England and Italy. He followed this with a try against Scotland in the quarter-finals and two tries in the semi-finals, as New Zealand lost to France. Lomu's tally of eight tries in this tournament is a World Cup record, although it has since been equalled by Habana in the 2007 tournament and Lomu's countryman Julian Savea in the 2015 tournament.

Lomu scored four tries in 2000, including a hat-trick against Scotland at Carisbrook and a try against Australia in the Tri Nations. This was followed by five tries in 2001, once again with a try against Australia in the Tri Nations. Lomu's final international tries came in November 2002, when he scored twice against England at Twickenham. Two weeks later, he made his last international appearance against Wales at the Millennium Stadium.  Lomu retired from professional rugby in 2007 due to a chronic kidney disorder. After suffering a heart attack on 18 November 2015 that was associated with his kidney condition, Lomu died at the age of 40.

International tries 
In the Score column, New Zealand's score is given first.

References

Lomu
International tries by Lomu
International tries by Lomu